Alberte Brun, also Alberte Brun-Michelis, was a French classical pianist.

Life 
Born in Paris, Brun studied at the Conservatoire de Paris with Marguerite Long. She received further instruction from Maurice Ravel, with whom she studied his Piano Concerto for the Left Hand. Commissioned by the Ministère des Beaux-Arts, she performed the complete piano works of Albert Roussel. She later lived in Germany, where she taught at the Robert Schumann Hochschule Düsseldorf in Düsseldorf. Her interpretations were documented by radio recordings. In 1975, she and her sister Andree Juliette Brun performed as a piano duo in the Carnegie Hall in New York.

Students 
 Helmut Kickton
 Reinhard Kluth
 Thorsten Pech

Recording 
 Claude Debussy: Préludes (aem records 1976)

References

External links 
 

20th-century French women classical pianists
Conservatoire de Paris alumni
Date of birth missing
Date of death missing
Musicians from Paris